Hamiri (also Romanized as Ḩamīrī, Hamīrī, and Homirī; also known as Ḩomēyrī, Ḩomeyrī, and Homeyrī Tūjān) is a village in Sarbuk Rural District, Sarbuk District, Qasr-e Qand County, Sistan and Baluchestan Province, Iran. At the 2006 census, its population was 2,132, in 430 families.

References 

Populated places in Qasr-e Qand County